Miguel de Zañartu Santa María  (1786 – 25 October 1851) was a Chilean politician and lawyer. During the Chilean Independence War he was a prominent Patriot being forced into exile to Mendoza in 1814 when the Patria Vieja fell to the Royalists. In 1817 he returned to Chile. Zañartu was among the signatories of the Chilean Declaration of Independence.

References

1786 births
1851 deaths
Members of the Chamber of Deputies of Chile
Chilean independence activists
19th-century Chilean lawyers
People from Concepción, Chile